Willem Jacob 'Boela' Serfontein (born 16 September 1988) is a South African rugby union footballer who last played for the  in Currie Cup rugby. He plays mostly as a lock.

Career

After spending four seasons with the  – making 62 appearances - he joined  for the 2014 season.

Personal

References

External links
 
 

Living people
1988 births
South African rugby union players
Rugby union locks
Rugby union players from Port Elizabeth
Pumas (Currie Cup) players
Blue Bulls players
Griquas (rugby union) players
Cheetahs (rugby union) players